Dimitrios Maris (born 24 June 1979) is a Greek footballer who plays as a defender. His best position is right full-back but he can be used also on the left wing. 
Since January 2014, THOI hired him as director of football academies of the club.

Club career
Maris previously played for are Preveza, AOAN, Fostiras, Panileiakos, Aris Limassol, Digenis Morphou, AEK Larnaca, AC Omonia, Alki Larnaca, Doxa Katokopias and Omonia Aradippou.

Personal
Maris is married to a Cypriot woman named Anna.

References

1979 births
Living people
Greek expatriate footballers
Paniliakos F.C. players
Aris Limassol FC players
Digenis Akritas Morphou FC players
AEK Larnaca FC players
AC Omonia players
Alki Larnaca FC players
Doxa Katokopias FC players
Omonia Aradippou players
ENTHOI Lakatamia FC players
Cypriot First Division players
Cypriot Second Division players
Expatriate footballers in Cyprus
Association football defenders
Footballers from Athens
Greek footballers
Greek expatriate sportspeople in Cyprus